George Willard Dickey [Skeets] (July 10, 1915 – June 16, 1976) was a backup catcher in Major League Baseball who played for two different teams between 1935 and 1947. He was the younger brother of Hall of Famer Bill Dickey.

A native of Kensett, Arkansas, Dickey entered the majors in 1935 with the Boston Red Sox, playing for them until 1936 before joining the Chicago White Sox (1941–42, 1946–47). He was one of many major leaguers who saw his baseball career interrupted when he joined the US Navy during World War II (1943–45). His most productive season came with the 1947 White Sox, when he appeared in a career-high 83 games while hitting .223 with one home run, six doubles, and 27 runs batted in.

In a six-season career, Dickey was a .204 hitter (101-for-494) with four home runs and 54 RBI in 226 games, including 36 runs, 12 doubles, and four stolen bases. 
Dickey married Mildred Allen Dickey and had three children; Mary Allen, Joye, and William.
Dickey died in DeWitt, Arkansas, at the age of 60.

References

Retrosheet
 Baseball in Wartime

1915 births
1976 deaths
Boston Red Sox players
Chicago White Sox players
Major League Baseball catchers
Baseball players from Arkansas
United States Navy personnel of World War II
Wheeling Stogies players
Scranton Miners players
Norfolk Tars players
Little Rock Travelers players
Milwaukee Brewers (minor league) players
Minneapolis Millers (baseball) players
Portland Beavers players
Oklahoma City Indians players
Birmingham Barons players
People from Kensett, Arkansas